Gerardo Lugo Gómez (born 13 March 1955) is a Mexican former professional footballer who played as a midfielder for Mexico at the 1978 FIFA World Cup.

Personal
Lugo's son, Édgar, is also a professional footballer who plays as a midfielder.

References

External links
FIFA profile

1955 births
Living people
Footballers from Mexico City
Mexico international footballers
Association football midfielders
1978 FIFA World Cup players
Atlante F.C. footballers
Cruz Azul footballers
Club León footballers
Mexican footballers
Liga MX players